Ololade "Lolly" Adefope (born 14 September 1990) is an English stand-up comedian and actress, specialising in character comedy. She is known for playing the role of Fran in the Hulu comedy series Shrill, and as Kitty, the ghost of a Georgian noblewoman in BBC comedy Ghosts, for which she was nominated for a National Comedy Award in 2021.

Early life and education
Adefope was born in  Sutton, South London to Nigerian parents and is of Yoruba descent. She went to Loughborough University to study English literature. While at university, she started performing with a sketch comedy group.

Career
After university, Adefope applied to drama school but was rejected, so she began working in an office. She began her career as a stand-up comic and transitioned into acting after receiving positive attention for solo shows at the Edinburgh Fringe Festival in 2015 and 2016. Also in 2015, she was selected for the BBC Writersroom comedy programme, and in 2016 she was nominated for two Chortle Awards.

As an actress, Adefope has appeared on Together, Josh, Plebs, Rovers, Sick Note, Ghosts, Miracle Workers, and Shrill. She has also participated as a guest on Alan Davies: As Yet Untitled, The Last Leg, Don't Ask Me Ask Britain and QI. She appeared on the fourth series of the panel show Taskmaster and the 100th anniversary suffragette special of 8 Out of 10 Cats Does Countdown.

Shrill star and co-creator Aidy Bryant has praised Adefope's acting for "how much she can convey with just the slightest movement of her eyes." Her performance in that show introduced her to wider audiences, and she began to receive a flood of offers for new roles. As of May 2021, she was working on developing a new television show that she would also star in, as well as a podcast. In October 2021, it was announced that Adefope will be appearing in an upcoming American television series, Girls Can't Shoot (& Other Lies) based on Scarlett Curtis's anthology, Feminists Don't Wear Pink (& Other Lies).

Filmography

References

External links

Black British women comedians
English stand-up comedians
Living people
1990 births
English people of Nigerian descent
21st-century English comedians
Comedians from London
English television actresses
21st-century English actresses
Actresses from London
Alumni of Loughborough University
Yoruba people